Lead Mine Pass is a mountain pass in the New Territories, Hong Kong. It is near Grassy Hill and two walking trails, MacLehose Trail (Stages 7 & 8) and Wilson Trail (Stage 7) intersect at the pass. The pass lies to the north of Shing Mun Reservoir.

See also
 List of gaps in Hong Kong
 Shing Mun Country Park
 Tai Po River

References

External links

 Centamap of Lead Mine Pass
 Why "Lead Mine" Pass? at industrialhistoryhk.org

Gaps of Hong Kong
Places in Hong Kong
Tai Po District
Tsuen Wan District